Folie à Deux is a Napa Valley winery in Sonoma County, California, which is part of the Trinchero Family Estates.

History
Folie à Deux was founded in 1981 by two psychiatrists, who took the name from a psychiatric term for a fantasy or delusion shared by two people. In 2004 they sold the winery to the Trinchero Family Estates, a Napa Valley wine company owned and operated by the Trinchero family. Trinchero Family Estates was named American Winery of the Year by Wine Enthusiast magazine in December 2009.

Varietals 

Folie à Deux currently makes Cabernet Sauvignon, Pinot Noir, Zinfandel, Merlot, Chardonnay, and Sauvignon blanc. The winery also produces three wine blends and four varietals under the name Menage à Trois. Menage à Trois Red was the top selling red wine product in the United States as of 2010. The Menage à Trois brand sold 1.6 million cases in 2009, and Menage à Trois was named the "Wine Brand of the Year" by the beverage industry publication Market Watch.

Reviews 
Folie à Deux wines have been reviewed favorably by Wine Enthusiast, Decanter, and other publications.

References

External links
 Folie à Deux Winery official website

Wineries in Napa Valley
Companies based in Napa County, California